Knobel may refer to:

Places
Knobel, Arkansas, a town in Clay County, Arkansas, United States
Knobel (crater), a crater on Mars

People
August Wilhelm Knobel, (1807–1863) a German Protestant theologian
Daniel Knobel, a South African military commander
Edward Knobel, (1841–1930) a British business man and amateur astronomer
Michele Knobel, professor and researcher in the area of literacy education

Surnames from nicknames